The  Fairbanks Grizzlies season was the team's fourth season as a professional indoor football franchise and third in the Indoor Football League (IFL). One of twenty-two teams that competed in the IFL for the 2011 season, the Fairbanks, Alaska-based Fairbanks Grizzlies finished first in the Pacific Division of the Intense Conference.

Under head coach Robert Fuller, the team played their home games at the Carlson Center in Fairbanks, Alaska.

Preseason

Schedule

Regular season

Schedule
Key:

Standings

Roster

References

Fairbanks Grizzlies
Fairbanks Grizzlies
American football in Alaska
Fairbanks Grizzlies